Lavington Smith (9 October 1904 – 9 May 1953) was an Australian cricketer. He played in one first-class match for South Australia in 1933/34.

See also
 List of South Australian representative cricketers

References

External links
 

1904 births
1953 deaths
Australian cricketers
South Australia cricketers
Cricketers from Adelaide